Manigango is a small township in Dege County, Garze Prefecture, Sichuan, China.  The town is located on the Tro Chu river on the east side of the Chola Mountains.  The area is part of the historical region of Kham in Tibet.  Today, Manigango is mainly known for Yihun Lhatso, a glacial lake 10km south of the town.  The town is connected via China National Highway 317 with Derge to the west and Ganzi to the east.

References

Township-level divisions of Sichuan
Populated places in the Garzê Tibetan Autonomous Prefecture